The 1966 Coupe Duvalier was an international football competition held in Port-au-Prince, Haiti, from June 11 to June 23, 1966. Six teams competed in a round-robin competition at the Stade Sylvio Cator.

Results

Table

References 

1966